William Stowe is the name of:
William Stowe (rower) (1940–2016), member of the 1964 Olympic gold medal eights crew
William Henry Stowe (1825–1855), British scholar and journalist
William McFerrin Stowe (1913–1988), American bishop of the Methodist and United Methodist Churches